Stromatoneurospora is a genus of fungi in the family Xylariaceae.

References

External links
Index Fungorum

Xylariales